The jugular tubercle is an oval eminence on the superior surface of the lateral parts of occipital bone. It overlies the hypoglossal canal and is sometimes crossed by an oblique groove for the glossopharyngeal, vagus, and accessory nerves.

References

External links
 
 Diagram at wayne.edu

Bones of the head and neck